The 2012 Men's European Volleyball League was the ninth edition of the annual Men's European Volleyball League, which featured men's national volleyball teams from ten European countries. A preliminary league round was played from May 24 to June 24, and the final four tournament, which was held at Ankara, Turkey.

During the league round, competing nations were drawn into two pools of five teams, and every team hosted a tournament with three other teams and played a round-robin system over three days. Every team played at four tournaments and one standings table was used, combined with all five tournaments. The Pool winners and runners-up qualified for the final four round, joining the host team.

The Netherlands defeated Turkey 3–2 in the final.

Teams

League round

Pool A

|}

Leg 1
Venue:  New Indoor Sport Hall, Katerini, Greece

|}

Leg 2
Venue:  Pabellón Municipal Los Planos, Teruel, Spain

|}

Leg 3
Venue:  Metrowest Sport Palace, Ra'anana, Israel

|}

Leg 4
Venue:  Kildeskovshallen, Gentofte, Denmark

|}

Leg 5
Venue:  Steel Aréna, Košice, Slovakia

|}

Pool B

|}

Leg 1
Venue:  Sala Polivalentă, Piatra Neamț, Romania

|}

Leg 2
Venue:  Burhan Felek Spor Salonu, Istanbul, Turkey

|}

Leg 3
Venue:  City Hall, Jablonec, Czech Republic

|}

Leg 4
Venue:  Topsportcentrum, Rotterdam, Netherlands

|}

Leg 5
Venue:  Sporthalle am See, Hard, Austria

|}

Final four
Venue:  Başkent Volleyball Hall, Ankara, Turkey

Qualified teams

 (host)

Semifinals

|}

Third place match

|}

Final

|}

Final standing

Awards

Most Valuable Player
  Emre Batur
Best Scorer
  Serhat Coşkun
Best Spiker
  Ibán Pérez
Best Blocker
  Jorge Fernandez Valcarel

Best Server
  Nimir Abdel-Aziz
Best Setter
  Nimir Abdel-Aziz
Best Receiver
  Gustavo Delgado Escribano
Best Libero
  Gijs Jorna

References

External links
 Confédération Européenne de Volleyball (CEV) – official website

European Volleyball League
Men's European Volleyball League
League
2012 in Turkish sport
2012